Jazon Jackson, better known by his stage name Jay Blaze, as an American rapper, record producer, songwriter, and CEO of  Global Sound Music Group. He resides in Los Angeles, California.

Early life 
The son of a single working mother, Jackson and his younger sister were shuttled about much as children, frequently moving around. Even in these days Blaze was a walking anomaly. Jackson displayed early talent as a songwriter he began rapping in middle school, often impressing his peers with lunchtime freestyle battles. Jay continued to hone his skills as a battle rapper. His work paid off when he got an opportunity to rap onstage alongside Wyclef Jean. Once he got to high school, he landed a spot on Power 106’s nightly “Whoa Call” battle rap competition. Though spending the majority of his high school years in the inner city school system, he went on to graduate from the affluent Beverly Hills High.

Personal life
Upon graduation, Jackson took a job at AT&T, eventually securing a position as one of the top retail sales consultants in the nation. While often solicited to work for other companies – including those in the music industry – Jackson politely declined, having resolved to never work for anyone else from there on out.

This mentality paid off. While working at AT&T, Blaze formed a camaraderie with frequent customer Rick St. Hilaire, a well-known music producer who boasts a list of artists the likes of Busta Rhymes, Whitney Houston and Missy Elliott. This casual friendship took a turn when Jackson went out of his way to assist Rick with an AT&T related issue, going against company procedures in the process. In exchange for the extra help, Rick agreed to a meeting to discuss Jackson's music.

Though unimpressed initially, Rick saw potential in Jackson and passed a number of opportunities his way to help him further his craft. After months of Internet promotion, consulting and even a school tour, Jackson received the chance to work in the recording studio with Rick. This time, St. Hilaire liked what he saw. From friendship to working relationship and, with the formation of Global Sound Music Group, LLC, business partnership, Rick St. Hilaire took Jackson under his wing.

Music and career 
As Jay's career as a businessman began to gain momentum, so did his career as an artist. Jay began to work with an unknown producer named Ronald “Jukebox” Jackson, who later became notable for producing Willow Smith's “Whip My Hair”. The first track he produced for Jay, “Move,” on May 11, 2008, he released it through multiple Internet vendors including iTunes, Amazon, and Rhapsody. In 2009 his songs, "Move" appeared on MTV's Making The Band 4 (season 3, episode 5 Hit The Road), and "I'm Here Now" on MTV's Making The Band 4 (season 3, episode 7 Sex & The Diddy). Building from the success of the single, Jay embarked on a school tour, performing in over 100 high schools and colleges throughout Southern California, and encouraging students to stay in school. Soon after, Jay Blaze featured Ray J on his new single tilted "Universal Man" and "Universal Man (Uptempo)". The song grew such a buzz that a video was shot, garnering attention from several premiere blogs, including Yahoo! and Vibe, and gaining airplay on MTV and VH1. Jay's next video, “No One Has 2 Know”, guest starred his close friend, Lamorne Morris, from Fox’s “New Girl”. He chose to work with Rick St. Hilaire and Jess Jackson, also notable for producing Tyga, to add the finishing touches to the album "Tunnel Vision".
In 2013 Jay Blaze was Young California pick of the week, the show was aired on Power 106 . Also this year a video premiered on HipHopDX called Puff Daddy. In 2014 Jay Blaze collaborated with crooner Dijon Talton for a music video titled Shorty She Bad. This video premiered on Vibe. Also Shorty She Bad was aired on MTV VOD. He also released an E.P. in 2014 titled Haterz Stay Back. In 2015 Jay Blaze interpolated Salt & Pepa's classic "Push it" and delivered a song titled P*$$y Real Good. Along with it a freestyle on HipHopDX called Hollywood Freestyle was also released.

Discography

Albums
2010: Tunnel Vision

Extended Play
2013: Universal Man
2014: Haterz Stay Back

Singles
2010: Follow Me (promotional single)
2010: Tunnel Vision (promotional single)
2010: TBA (official single)

Filmography

References

External links 
 JayBlaze.com
 Global Sound Music Group
 Jay Blaze at MySpace
 Jay Blaze at Facebook
 Jay Blaze at Twitter
 Jay Blaze at YouTube
 Jay Blaze at Discogs

Living people
Record producers from California
Year of birth missing (living people)